David Staniforth (born 5 April 1976 in Durban) is a field hockey goalkeeper from South Africa, who was a member of the national squad that finished tenth at the 2004 Summer Olympics in Athens. The goalie plays for a provincial team called KwaZulu Natal Raiders.

Staniforth was named South African Hockey's Male Personality of the Year for 2002. He made the match-winning save from Belgian player, Jean-Philippe Brulé's flick in a penalty shoot-out to decide the final Olympic qualifying place for the 2004 Athens Games. Staniforth was substituted into the game specifically for the penalty shoot-out after the game had ended at 2-2 and the golden goal period remained scoreless.

He currently plays for English side Fareham Hockey Club, in Hampshire and coaches the University of Southampton's male and female hockey teams.

International senior tournaments
 2001 – Champions Challenge, Kuala Lumpur (2nd)
 2002 – World Cup, Kuala Lumpur (13th)
 2002 – Commonwealth Games, Manchester (4th)
 2003 – All-Africa Games, Abuja (2nd)
 2003 – Champions Challenge, Johannesburg (3rd)
 2004 – Olympic Qualifier, Madrid (7th)
 2004 – Summer Olympics, Athens (10th)
 2005 – Champions Challenge, Alexandria (5th)

References

External links 

1976 births
Living people
South African male field hockey players
Male field hockey goalkeepers
Olympic field hockey players of South Africa
South African field hockey coaches
Field hockey players at the 2002 Commonwealth Games
2002 Men's Hockey World Cup players
Field hockey players at the 2004 Summer Olympics
Commonwealth Games competitors for South Africa
Sportspeople from Durban
Expatriate field hockey players
Railway Union field hockey players
South African expatriate sportspeople in Ireland
South African expatriate sportspeople in England
Competitors at the 2003 All-Africa Games
African Games competitors for South Africa